Hathala is a town and union council in Kulachi tehsil, Dera Ismail Khan District of Khyber-Pakhtunkhwa. It is located at 32°2'56N 70°34'18E and has an altitude of 208 metres (685 feet).

References

Union councils of Dera Ismail Khan District
Populated places in Dera Ismail Khan District